Delilah DiCrescenzo (born February 9, 1983) is an American distance runner. She competes in the women's 3000 metres steeplechase. She is a 2001 graduate of Queen of Peace High School in Burbank, Illinois and a 2005 graduate of Columbia University, where she majored in sociology. In May 2011, DiCrescenzo received her master's degree in Sports Management, also from Columbia University. She now competes for the New York Athletic Club and trains with the NJ-NY Track Club under the guidance of Coach Frank Gagliano.  As of 2013 she was sponsored by Puma and continued to compete on a worldwide level.

She is also well known as the subject of the Plain White T's platinum hit "Hey There Delilah".

Running career
She finished 3rd in the steeple chase at the 2006 US Nationals, and won the 6K title at the USATF National Club Cross Country Championships in the fall of 2007. She competed at the 2008 U.S. Olympic trials where she made the finals, but did not qualify for the Olympic team.

She fared better in cross country running the following year: at the USA Cross Country Championships she finished in fourth place, and qualified to compete at the 2009 IAAF World Cross Country Championships, finishing in 33rd (which was the second-best performance by a North American athlete after Julie Culley). She headed Team USA to the gold with a win at the Americas Cross Country Championships – she won the NACAC-endorsed competition over a 6 km course at the Mt. Irvine Resort in Tobago, beating several other Americans who had previously beaten her in qualifying at the USA Cross Country National Championships.

DiCrescenzo qualified for the 2011 IAAF World Track and Field Championships in the 3000m steeplechase by finishing third at the US Championships in a time of 9:46.31. However, she did not compete due to injury.

DiCrescenzo failed to qualify for the 2012 London Olympics, finishing 13th at USA 10 km Championships (33:36) and 7th in steeplechase at Olympic Trials (9:46.30).

On February 2, 2013, she again qualified for the 2013 IAAF World Cross Country Championship with a 6th place finish in a time of 26:57.2 at the USA Cross Country Championships in Forest Park in St. Louis, Missouri.  At the world championships, she finished 47th.

On May 7, 2017, DiCrescenzo won the women's division of Southwest Half Marathon held in Palos Heights with a time of 1:21:31, which was nearly seven minutes ahead of the second-place finisher.

"Hey There Delilah"

She is the subject of the Plain White T's 2006 song "Hey There Delilah", which reached number 1 on the Billboard Hot 100 in 2007.  She had met Plain White T's singer Tom Higgenson through a mutual friend.  Higgenson was inspired to write the song after meeting her.  Though the two were never in a relationship, DiCrescenzo did attend the 2008 Grammy Award show as the guest of Higgenson, where her namesake song was nominated for 2008 Song of the Year (won by Amy Winehouse for "Rehab").

References

External links 
 
 

1983 births
Living people
American female middle-distance runners
American female long-distance runners
American female steeplechase runners
Columbia Lions women's track and field athletes
American people of Italian descent
Place of birth missing (living people)
New York (state) Democrats
21st-century American women